LY6/PLAUR domain containing 5 is a protein that in humans is encoded by the LYPD5 gene.

References

Further reading 

Human proteins